Edwin Olamide Agbaje (born 25 January 2004) is an Irish professional footballer who plays as a defender for  club Yeovil Town on loan from Ipswich Town.

Career
Agbaje moved from Shamrock Rovers to Ipswich Town in 2022. He made his first-team debut for the club on 18 October 2022, when he was described as being "impressive and composed" starting on the right side of the defence in a 1–0 defeat at Cambridge United in the EFL Trophy. The East Anglian Daily Times reported that he "grew in confidence and contributed to the attack". Manager Kieran McKenna described him as a "really hungry and determined young man".

On 27 January 2023, Agbaje joined National League side Yeovil Town on loan until the end of the season.

Style of play
Agbaje is an athletic right-back.

Career statistics

References

2004 births
Living people
People from Edenderry, County Offaly
Sportspeople from County Offaly
Republic of Ireland association footballers
Republic of Ireland youth international footballers
Association football defenders
Association football fullbacks
Shamrock Rovers F.C. players
Ipswich Town F.C. players
Yeovil Town F.C. players
English Football League players
National League (English football) players
Expatriate footballers in England
Irish people of Nigerian descent